KBTM (1230 AM and heard on 101.3 FM through translator K267AS and 102.1 FM through translator K271CV) is a radio station broadcasting a News Talk Information format. Licensed to Jonesboro, Arkansas, United States, it serves the Jonesboro area.  The station is currently owned by East Arkansas Broadcasters of Jonesboro, LLC.  Since 2014, KBTM has also served as the broadcast home for Valley View High School football and boys & girls' basketball.

Past personalities
 Clarence Adams, newscaster (1938, 1948, 1953–55)

Ken Miller, newscaster (1980s)

References

External links

News and talk radio stations in the United States
BTM
Radio stations established in 1982
1982 establishments in Arkansas